Jämjö GoIF is a Swedish football club located in Jämjö.

Background
Jämjö GoIF currently plays in Division 4 Blekinge which is the sixth tier of Swedish football. They play their home matches at Jämjö IP.

The club is affiliated to Blekinge Fotbollförbund. Jämjö GoIF have competed in the Svenska Cupen on 10 occasions.

Uppdaterades 2018

Season to season
{| 
|valign="top" width=0%|

Footnotes

External links
 Jämjö GoIF – Official website
 Jämjö GoIF on Facebook

Football clubs in Blekinge County
Association football clubs established in 1929
1929 establishments in Sweden